Gallagic acid is a polyphenolic chemical compound that can be found in the ellagitannins, a type of tannin, found in Punica granatum (pomegranate). It is a building block of the corresponding tannin punicalagin, punicalin, punicacortein C and 2-O-galloyl-punicalin.

See also 
 Gallagic acid dilactone (a.k.a. gallagyldilactone or terminalin)

References 

Ellagitannins
Pomegranate ellagitannins